Celaenagonum is a genus of ground beetles in the family Carabidae. There are about eight described species in Celaenagonum, found in Asia.

Species
These eight species belong to the genus Celaenagonum:
 Celaenagonum angulum Morvan, 2006  (China)
 Celaenagonum deuvei (Morvan, 1999)  (China)
 Celaenagonum eurydamas (Bates, 1883)  (Japan)
 Celaenagonum kesharishresthae Morvan, 1999  (Nepal)
 Celaenagonum kucerai Morvan, 2002  (India)
 Celaenagonum mantillerii Morvan, 2006  (China)
 Celaenagonum obesum Morvan & Tian, 2001  (China)
 Celaenagonum pangxiongfeii Morvan & Tian, 2001  (China)

References

Further reading

 

Platyninae